Denílson de Oliveira Araújo (born 24 August 1977), known simply as Denílson, is a Brazilian football pundit and former professional player who played as a forward.

In a 17-year career, he played mainly for São Paulo and Real Betis who made him the world's most expensive player in 1998. He also appeared for teams in five other countries during his career.

Denílson gained more than 60 caps for Brazil, making his full debut before his 20th birthday and representing the nation in six international tournaments, including two World Cups (winning the 2002 edition). Denilson was known for his dribbling skills.

Club career

São Paulo and Betis
Born in Diadema, São Paulo, Denílson made his senior debuts with local São Paulo at the age of only 17, appearing with the team in the 1994 Copa CONMEBOL and winning the tournament.

In 1998, he broke the world-record transfer fee when Real Betis paid £21.5 million for his services. He made his La Liga debut on 29 August in a 0–0 away draw against Deportivo Alavés, and finished his first season with 35 games and two goals as his team ranked in 11th position; the Andalusians were relegated to Segunda División in 2000.

Denílson spent some months back in his country with Flamengo, on loan, but returned in January 2001 to be a productive attacking unit for Betis as it achieved promotion back (21 games, one goal). He continued to be regularly played in the following top flight campaigns, but more often than not as a substitute.

In 2004–05 Betis finished in fourth position and qualified to the UEFA Champions League, also adding the season's Copa del Rey, but Denílson was only a fringe player now, starting in just three games and playing only 290 minutes.

Bordeaux
In the 2005 off-season, Denílson was sold to French club Bordeaux for an undisclosed amount, four years before his Betis contract was due to expire. In his only season in Ligue 1 he appeared regularly to help to a second-place finish, albeit trailing eventual champions Olympique Lyonnais by 15 points.

As the team failed to match Denílson's wage demands, he left and signed for Saudi Arabia's Al Nassr FC, where he played for a couple of months.

FC Dallas
On 24 August 2007, Denílson joined FC Dallas of Major League Soccer, becoming the team's designated player. he made his league debut on 1 September, entering in the 55th minute against D.C. United, and the following week he made his first start, against Toronto FC at Pizza Hut Park, scoring from the penalty spot in the 36th minute of an eventual 2–0 win.

After only one goal and no assists, Denílson was excluded from Dallas' squad for their appearance in the final of the U.S. Open Cup, raising questions of whether he would remain with the club following the season (even though Open Cup regulations allowed no more than five foreign players on the game-day roster). Further fueling speculation, head coach Steve Morrow said the player would need to "earn a spot in the starting lineup like everybody else"; goalkeeper Darío Sala added the team was having problems adjusting to a change in scheme to accommodate Denílson.

Later years
At the end of the season, FC Dallas decided not to pick up its option on Denílson, but stated their desire to resign the winger at a lower salary. In February 2008 he signed a one-year performance-based contract with Palmeiras, hoping the club structure and experienced coach Vanderlei Luxemburgo would help him recover his best football. He was unable to make the starting squad, spending most of the season as a bench option; nonetheless, he helped Verdão to the São Paulo State Championship and a berth in the Copa Libertadores after the fourth place in the Série A.

On 6 January 2009, Denílson was taken on trial by Premier League side Bolton Wanderers with a chance to sign a contract until the end of the campaign. He stated: "I want to play in Europe, but I am not in a rush. I have received proposals from England, Greece, Turkey and Germany. I am studying them", further adding: "I understand that this is the time to return to European football, but if I am not convinced by any offer I hope to continue in Brazil, where there are also clubs interested in me"; eventually, nothing came of it.

After terminating his contract with Palmeiras, 31-year-old Denílson signed a three-month contract with Itumbiara. On 2 June 2009 he penned a six-month deal with Vietnamese club Hải Phòng F.C. on a pay-as-you-play contract. He made his debut on the 21st against Hoàng Anh Gia Lai, scoring through a free kick just two minutes into the game, but left after only three weeks with the team with only that single appearance to his credit due to injury. Denílson was paid $12,000 for the match and a $5,000 bonus for the goal.

In January 2010, Denílson signed a two-year contract with Kavala in Greece. He was released on 16 April, without having played any games.

International career
Denílson made his debut for Brazil in November 1996 at the age of 19, against Cameroon. He was called for the squad that competed at the 1998 FIFA World Cup, appearing in all the games for the eventual runners-up; the previous year, he was also selected for the 1997 Copa América and the 1997 FIFA Confederations Cup, winning both tournaments and totalling ten appearances (two goals).

Denílson was picked by manager Luiz Felipe Scolari for his 2002 World Cup squad in Japan and South Korea. Always as a substitute, he played in five matches as the Seleção won its fifth World Cup, appearing one minute in the final against Germany.

After Carlos Alberto Parreira returned for his third spell as national team boss, Denílson was not called again. He gained a total of 61 caps.

Style of play
A creative and technically gifted left-footed player, Denilson was mainly known for his dribbling skills, in particular for his use of several feints to beat opponents such as the step over, which he frequently employed, though infamous for his inability in front of goal. Despite his talent, he was considered by most to not have fulfilled the potential he showed at the start of his career.

Media
Denílson was sponsored by sportswear company Nike, and appeared in commercials for the brand. In a global advertising campaign in the run-up to the 2002 World Cup in Korea and Japan, he starred in a "Secret Tournament" commercial (branded "Scorpion KO") directed by Terry Gilliam, appearing alongside football players such as Fabio Cannavaro, Hernán Crespo, Edgar Davids, Rio Ferdinand, Luís Figo, Paul Scholes, Thierry Henry, Gaizka Mendieta, Hidetoshi Nakata, Ronaldinho, Ronaldo and Francesco Totti among others, with former player Eric Cantona the tournament "referee". In March 2017 Denilson signed with 888poker as a brand ambassador.

Post-retirement
After retiring, Denílson worked as a sports commentator for Rede Bandeirantes.

Honours
São Paulo
Copa CONMEBOL: 1994
Campeonato Paulista: 1998

Betis
Copa del Rey: 2004–05

Palmeiras
Campeonato Paulista: 2008

Brazil
FIFA World Cup: 2002, runner-up: 1998
FIFA Confederations Cup: 1997
Copa America: 1997
CONCACAF Gold Cup third place: 1998

Individual
FIFA Confederations Cup: Golden Ball 1997
South American Team of the Year: 1997

References

External links

1977 births
Living people
Footballers from São Paulo (state)
Naturalised citizens of Spain
Brazilian footballers
Association football wingers
Campeonato Brasileiro Série A players
São Paulo FC players
CR Flamengo footballers
Sociedade Esportiva Palmeiras players
Itumbiara Esporte Clube players
La Liga players
Segunda División players
Real Betis players
Ligue 1 players
FC Girondins de Bordeaux players
Al Nassr FC players
Major League Soccer players
FC Dallas players
Designated Players (MLS)
V.League 1 players
Haiphong FC players
Kavala F.C. players
Saudi Professional League players
Brazil under-20 international footballers
Brazil international footballers
1997 Copa América players
1997 FIFA Confederations Cup players
1998 CONCACAF Gold Cup players
1998 FIFA World Cup players
2001 Copa América players
2002 FIFA World Cup players
FIFA World Cup-winning players
FIFA Confederations Cup-winning players
Copa América-winning players
Brazilian expatriate footballers
Brazilian expatriate sportspeople in Spain
Brazilian expatriate sportspeople in France
Brazilian expatriate sportspeople in Saudi Arabia
Brazilian expatriate sportspeople in the United States
Brazilian expatriate sportspeople in Vietnam
Brazilian expatriate sportspeople in Greece
Expatriate footballers in Spain
Expatriate footballers in France
Expatriate footballers in Saudi Arabia
Expatriate soccer players in the United States
Expatriate footballers in Vietnam
Expatriate footballers in Greece
People from Diadema